Edith A. Pérez is a Puerto Rican hematologist-oncologist. She is the Serene M. and Frances C. Durling Professor of Medicine at the Mayo Clinic Alix School of Medicine.

Early life and education 
Perez was born and raised in Humacao, Puerto Rico. Her mother was a teacher and librarian and her father owned a grocery store.  During her freshman year at University of Puerto Rico, Río Piedras Campus, Perez's grandmother died. Her death motivated her to become a physician. In 1975, she graduated magna cum laude with a B.S. in Biology.

Perez completed her M.D. at the University of Puerto Rico School of Medicine. She completed her residency in internal medicine at the Loma Linda University Medical Center. Perez conducted a fellowship in hematology and oncology at the Martinez VA Medical Center through the UC Davis School of Medicine.

Career 
In 2020, Perez joined Bolt Biotherapeutics as its Chief Medical Officer.  Prior to joining Bolt, she worked as the Vice President and Head of the BioOncology-U.S. Medical Affairs unit at Genentech from 2015 to 2018, where she led the development and conduct of translational studies with registrational intent, including engaging in discussions with the FDA. Her activities those years also included membership in the Genentech/Roche Cancer Immunotherapy Governance Committee.

In 1995, Perez joined Mayo Clinic where she spent two decades gaining academic experience and establishing herself as a leader in the oncology community. She began as an Assistant Professor and was promoted to Professor and then Full Professor of Medicine in 2001, an appointment she currently maintains. While at Mayo Clinic, Perez served as Director of the Mayo Clinic Breast Cancer Translational Genomics Program and Supplemental Consultant in the Department of Hematology/Oncology and Cancer Biology. 

Dr. Perez has also been involved in multiple diversity leadership initiatives with ASCO and AACR, and currently serves as the Chair of the Health Equity Committee for Stand Up to Cancer. Moreover, she was elected as Vice-Chair for the Scientific Advisory Committee of Stand up to Cancer and also as a member of the NASEM Committee on Improving the Representation of Women and Underrepresented Minorities in Clinical Trials and Research in 2021. Her compassion for patients and passion for advancing science, research, prevention, education, and access to medicines are drivers of her career. With respect for all aspects of the health care system, integrity and compliance have been pivotal in her path.    

Perez has served as principal investigator in the development and execution of a wide range of clinical trials exploring the use of new therapeutic agents for the treatment and prevention of breast cancer. These clinical trials highlighted the need for basic research studies to evaluate the role of genetic markers in the development and aggressiveness of breast cancer. Her leadership in spearheading these basic research studies has helped advance an understanding of biomarkers' prognostic and predictive applicability.

Personal life
In addition to her academic and biomedical industry pursuits, Perez co-founded the 26.2 National Marathon to Finish Breast Cancer (breastcancermarathon.com), with goals to raise funds for underserved women and genomics/immunologic translational cancer research. She not only co-founded the race, but she also runs it every year.  More than 12,000 families have received assistance from the proceeds and more than $2.5M has been raised for cancer research.

Accomplishments 
While she was working at the Mayo Clinic, Perez was essential to the N9831 trial, which demonstrated the impact of adding trastuzumab (Herceptin®) to improve disease-free and overall survival for patients with early-stage HER-2 positive breast cancer.   The combination of chemotherapy and trastuzumab, as opposed to chemotherapy alone, improved the survival rate of patients by 33%, helping to save thousands of lives in the US and globally.  During her time with Genentech, Perez was instrumental to the trial and launch of six cancer medications, including Gazyva®, Perjeta®, Alecensa® and Tenctriq®.   She has contributed to, authored and published over 300 research articles, which can be found here.

References

Year of birth missing (living people)
Living people
American oncologists
Women oncologists
Place of birth missing (living people)
American LGBT scientists
20th-century American physicians
20th-century American women physicians
21st-century American physicians
21st-century American women physicians
Physicians of the Mayo Clinic
University of Puerto Rico, Río Piedras Campus alumni
University of Puerto Rico School of Medicine alumni
Puerto Rican hematologists
Women hematologists
Puerto Rican women physicians
Lesbian scientists
Puerto Rican lesbians
People from Humacao, Puerto Rico
LGBT physicians